Aland Assembly constituency is one of the 224 Legislative Assembly constituencies of Karnataka state in India. It is in Kalaburagi district and is a part of Bidar Lok Sabha constituency.

Members of Legislative Assembly

Hyderabad State
 1951: Veerendra Patil, Indian National Congress

Mysore State
 1957 (Seat-1): Chandrashekhar S Patil, Indian National Congress
 1957 (Seat-2): Ramchandra Veerappa, Indian National Congress
 1962: Devappa Shamanna Hodal, Indian National Congress
 1967: Devappa Shamanna Hodal, Indian National Congress 
 1972: D. R. B. Rao, Indian National Congress

Karnataka State
 1978: Anna Rao Bhem Rao Patil Koralli, Janata Party
 1983: B. R. Patil, Janata Party
 1985: Sharanabasappa Mali Patil Dhangapur, Indian National Congress 
 1989: Sharanabasappa Mali Patil Dhangapur, Indian National Congress 
 1994: Subhash Rukmayya Guttedar, Karnataka Congress Party
 1999: Subhash Rukmayya Guttedar, Janata Dal (Secular)
 2004: B. R. Patil, Janata Dal (Secular)
 2008: Subhash Rukmayya Guttedar, Janata Dal (Secular)
 2013: B. R. Patil, Karnataka Janata Paksha

Election results

2018

Previous results
Source:

See also
Kalaburagi district
 Alanda
 Kalaburagi district
 List of constituencies of Karnataka Legislative Assembly

References

Assembly constituencies of Karnataka
Kalaburagi district